The Three Rings are fictional artifacts in Tolkien's legendarium.

Three Rings, or variations, may also refer to:

Arts and entertainment
 Three-ring circus or three-ring
 Three Rings Design, a video game developer
 Three Ringz, a 2008 album by T-Pain
 "Three Rings" (song), by Grizzly Bear, 2017

Animals
 Three Rings (horse), winner of the 1950 Edgemere Handicap
 Ypthima butterflies
 Ypthima asterope, the common three-ring
 Ypthima watsoni, the looped three-ring
 Ypthima yatta, the Yatta three-ring

Other uses
 3-ring release system, a parachute component
 Three-ring binder, a type of paper filing container
 Tricyclic chemical compounds (3-ringed chemical compounds)
 Heterocyclic compounds, 3-ring

See also
 Borromean rings, three simple closed curves in three-dimensional space 
 Ring Ring Ring (disambiguation)
 Ring 3 (disambiguation)
 Three Ring Circus (disambiguation)
 Third Ring Road (disambiguation)
 Ring (disambiguation)
 Tricycle (disambiguation)